Frontier Force usually means any of a Paramilitary type border security or border guard, it can mean any of the following:

 Frontier Force Regiment (popularly known as the "Piffers" or the "FF"), one of six Infantry regiments in the Pakistan Army
5 Gorkha Rifles (Frontier Force), part of the British Indian Army (subsequently part of the Indian Army)
10th Queen Victoria's Own Corps Of Guides Cavalry (Frontier Force), part of the British Indian Army
11th Prince Albert Victor's Own Cavalry (Frontier Force), part of the British Indian Army.
12th Cavalry (Frontier Force), part of the British Indian Army.
 12th Frontier Force Regiment, part of the British Indian Army
 13th Frontier Force Rifles, part of the British Indian Army, formed in 1922 by amalgamation of five existing regiments
 Royal West African Frontier Force, a multi-battalion field force, formed by the British Colonial Office in 1900
 Special Frontier Force, a paramilitary unit of India 
 Transjordan Frontier Force
 Liberian Frontier Force (LFF), which later became the Armed Forces of Liberia

See also
 Frontier Corps, Pakistan